Noguez is a surname. Notable people with the surname include: 

Dominique Noguez (1942–2019), French writer
John Noguez (born 1964), Mexican American politician
María Isabel Studer Noguez, Mexican professor and researcher